Patrick Joseph Garrity (born August 23, 1976) is an American former professional basketball player who played for ten years in the National Basketball Association (NBA). He was a member of the National Basketball Players Association Executive Committee from 2000 to 2008 where he served as secretary and treasurer. He is currently the assistant general manager of the Detroit Pistons.

High school years
At Lewis-Palmer High School in Monument, Colorado, Garrity was a three time All-State selection and part of the 1994 Class 4A State of Colorado High School Basketball Championship team. He was a three time All-State selection and the Class 4A player of the year for the 1993–94 season as well as valedictorian of his high school class. His jersey, number 53, is retired at Lewis-Palmer High School.

College career
At the University of Notre Dame, Garrity played four years with the Fighting Irish averaging double-digits in scoring in all four seasons, including a 23.2 point-per-game average in his senior season of 1997–98. He was the Big East Men's Basketball Player of the Year in 1997. In 1998, he was a Consensus Second Team All-America selection. He was a two-time Academic All-America selection as well as Academic All-American of the Year for Division I men's basketball in 1998.

Professional career
Garrity was drafted by the Milwaukee Bucks with the 19th pick of the 1998 NBA draft. The Bucks traded his rights and the rights to Dirk Nowitzki, to the Dallas Mavericks for the rights to Robert Traylor. Then Garrity's rights, along with Martin Müürsepp, Bubba Wells, and a first-round draft pick, were traded to the Phoenix Suns in exchange for Steve Nash.

Garrity played in Phoenix averaging 5.6 points per game in 39 appearances (in an NBA lockout-shortened 50-game regular season). He was traded, along with Danny Manning and two future draft picks, to the Orlando Magic for Penny Hardaway.

He played in all 82 games with Orlando in 1999–2000, averaging 8.2 points per game and shooting 40.1 percent from three-point territory. He had a similar performance in 2000–01, and then in 2001–02 his scoring average hit a career-high of 11.1 points per game as he started 43 of the 80 games he played. On March 19, 2002, in a 101–91 win over the Milwaukee Bucks, Garrity made a career high 7 three pointers on his way to a 21 point total. During the season he ranked 7th in the NBA in both 3 point field goal percentage and 3 point field goals made. Garrity participated in the 2001 and 2003 Three-Point Contests during NBA All-Star Weekend.

His average dipped to 10.7 points per game in 2002–03. That season, on November 2, 2002, Garrity scored 13 points and grabbed a career high 15 rebounds in a 100–90 win over the Bucks. Garrity's 2003–04 campaign ended after he played in only two games due to cartilage damage in his right knee, which forced him to undergo microfracture surgery.

On January 26, 2006, Garrity scored 24 points in a 119–115 overtime win against the Philadelphia 76ers. On September 11, 2008, he announced his retirement from professional basketball. About 2009 he was taking classes at the Fuqua School of Business at Duke University.

Post-playing career
Garrity worked for Bridgewater Associates before returning to the NBA as director of strategic planning for the Detroit Pistons. On June 15, 2016, Garrity was promoted and became the assistant general manager of the Detroit Pistons.

NBA career statistics

Regular season 

|-
| align="left" | 1998–99
| align="left" | Phoenix
| 39 || 9 || 13.8 || .500 || .389 || .714 || 1.9 || .5 || .2 || .1 || 5.6
|-
| align="left" | 1999–00
| align="left" | Orlando
| 82 || 1 || 18.0 || .441 || .401 || .721 || 2.6 || .7 || .4 || .2 || 8.2
|-
| align="left" | 2000–01
| align="left" | Orlando
| 76 || 1 || 20.8 || .387 || .433 || .867 || 2.8 || .7 || .5 || .2 || 8.3
|-
| align="left" | 2001–02
| align="left" | Orlando
| 80 || 43 || 30.1 || .426 || .427 || .836 || 4.2 || 1.2 || .8 || .3 || 11.1
|-
| align="left" | 2002–03
| align="left" | Orlando
| 81 || 53 || 31.9 || .419 || .396 || .830 || 3.8 || 1.5 || .8 || .2 || 10.7
|-
| align="left" | 2003–04
| align="left" | Orlando
| 2 || 0 || 11.0 || .333 || .000 || .000 || .0 || .5 || .0 || .0 || 1.0
|-
| align="left" | 2004–05
| align="left" | Orlando
| 71 || 0 || 13.5 || .402 || .333 || .879 || 1.7 || .4 || .3 || .1 || 4.6
|-
| align="left" | 2005–06
| align="left" | Orlando
| 57 || 0 || 16.5 || .417 || .388 || .811 || 1.9 || .7 || .2 || .2 || 4.9
|-
| align="left" | 2006–07
| align="left" | Orlando
| 33 || 0 || 8.4 || .314 || .344 || .889 || 1.3 || .4 || .2 || .0 || 2.2
|-
| align="left" | 2007–08
| align="left" | Orlando
| 31 || 0 || 9.2 || .338 || .216 || .800 || 1.4 || .4 || .2 || .0 || 2.1
|- class="sortbottom"
| style="text-align:center;" colspan="2"| Career
| 552 || 107 || 20.0 || .417 || .398 || .806 || 2.6 || .8 || .4 || .1 || 7.3

Playoffs 

|-
| align="left" | 1999
| align="left" | Phoenix
| 3 || 0 || 17.3 || .529 || 1.000 || 1.000 || 3.0 || .3 || .3 || .3 || 9.0
|-
| align="left" | 2001
| align="left" | Orlando
| 4 || 0 || 29.3 || .472 || .500 || .800 || 1.3 || .5 || .0 || .2 || 12.0
|-
| align="left" | 2002
| align="left" | Orlando
| 4 || 4 || 36.8 || .375 || .389 || .750 || 7.5 || 2.3 || .5 || .2 || 8.5
|-
| align="left" | 2003
| align="left" | Orlando
| 7 || 1 || 23.3 || .286 || .235 || 1.000 || 2.6 || .7 || .3 || .4 || 4.0
|-
| align="left" | 2008
| align="left" | Orlando
| 2 || 0 || 3.0 || .000 || .000 || .500 || 1.0 || .0 || .0 || .0 || .5
|- class="sortbottom"
| style="text-align:center;" colspan="2"| Career || 20 || 5 || 24.3 || .393 || .407 || .857 || 3.2 || .9 || .2 || .3 || 6.9

References

External links
NBA.com Profile – Pat Garrity
Pat Garrity @ Basketball-Reference.com

1976 births
Living people
All-American college men's basketball players
American men's basketball players
Basketball players from Colorado
Basketball players from Nevada
Detroit Pistons executives
Fuqua School of Business alumni
Milwaukee Bucks draft picks
Notre Dame Fighting Irish men's basketball players
Orlando Magic players
People from Monument, Colorado
Phoenix Suns players
Power forwards (basketball)
Sportspeople from Las Vegas